Kristen Ashburn (born 1973) is an American photojournalist. In 2001, she began photographing the impact of AIDS in southern Africa, and since then has produced stories on the spread of tuberculosis (TB) in the Russian penal system, Jewish settlers and suicide bombers in Israel’s Occupied Territories, the aftermath of the tsunami in Sri Lanka and of Hurricane Katrina in New Orleans. Her work has appeared in many publications, including The New Yorker, Time, Newsweek, and Life. She lives in New York City.

In addition to her humanitarian photography, Ashburn is one of the directors of Through the Eyes of Children: The Rwanda Project, a charity that teaches photography to orphans of the 1994 Rwandan genocide and supports them through the sale of their images.

Awards
 Emmy Award nomination (2007) - Bloodline: AIDS and Family multimedia project, produced by Mediastorm.org 
 The John Faber Award of the Overseas Press Club of America (2007) - "The African Scourge", first published in The Los Angeles Times
 National Press Photographers Association's (NNPA) Best of Photojournalism Award (2007, 2006, 2003)
 Pictures of the Year Award (2007)
 Getty Images Grant for Editorial Photography (2006)
 World Press Photo (2005, 2003)
 Canon Female Photojournalist Award/AFJ (2004)
 Marty Forscher Fellowship for Humanistic Photography (2003)

Recent work
In 2007, Ashburn worked as a consulting producer on the documentary film I Am Because We Are, which was produced and written by Madonna. A book of images bearing the same title is being published by powerHouse Books in December 2008.

References

External links
 Kristen Ashburn's website
 Contact Press Images' website
 Bloodline: AIDS and Family
 Through the Eyes of Children: The Rwanda Project
 "The African Scourge", published in the Los Angeles Times
 Getty Images Grants for Editorial Photography
 I Am Because We Are: A Documentary Film produced by Madonna
 I Am Because We Are (the companion book to the film)
 Mediastorm.org
 
 
 The face of AIDS in Africa (TED2003)

American photojournalists
American women journalists
American women photographers
1973 births
Living people
21st-century American women
Women photojournalists